Liu Lijuan may refer to:

 Liu Lijuan (rower)
 Liu Lijuan (sitting volleyball)